Neisseria elongata is a Gram negative bacterium and is different from the other cocci shaped members of the genus Neisseria as it is rod shaped. Unlike other Neisseria it is catalase negative.
N. elongata is the most ancestral of the human Neisseria.

References

External links
Type strain of Neisseria elongata at BacDive -  the Bacterial Diversity Metadatabase
Article in PLoS ONE

Neisseriales